Silvano Albanese (born 11 July 1983, in Nocera Inferiore, Italy) and better known by his stage name Coez is an Italian singer and rapper.

Career 
Born in Nocera Inferiore in the province of Salerno, he grew up in Rome. He studied comedy at Scuola Cinematografica and his first musical project was Circolo Vizioso in collaboration with Franz and Nicco. After a self-titled mixtape, he released his first official release Terapia produced by Ford 78 and Sine.

In 2007, he met Lucci and Bruno Cannavicci (better known as Snais), who were members of the band Unabombers, and with addition of Franz and Nicco from Circolo Vizioso days, the five formed the collective Brokenspeakers. The formation had great success all over Italy even opening for Busta Rhymes.

In parallel with working with the Brokenspeakers, Coez took a solo career and in 2009 released his solo album Figlio di nessuno that also included collaborations with Lucci, Hube, Nicco & Franz, Julia and Supremo73. In November 2011, he released the mixtape Fenomeno mixed with DJ Sine. Coez's first big commercially successful solo single was "Nella casa" followed by the album Non erano fiori on the Carosello Records and in collaboration with Riccardo Sinigallia. The album reached the Top 10 of the official Italian Albums Chart. He was also featured as a newcomer artist in the Music Summer Festival. In 2014, he collaborated with Gemitaiz & MadMan and in September 2015, he released Niente che non va with the single "La rabbia dei secondi" from the album. On May 5, 2017, he released his fourth solo album, Faccio un casino reaching #2 on the Italian Albums Chart. It was certified gold. The title track made it to the Top 10 on the Italian Singles Chart with a second track "La musica non c'è" topping the Italian Singles Chart making it his first #1 hit in Italy. Faccio un casino was nominated for IMPALA's European Album of the Year Award.

Discography

Albums

Mixtape 
 2011: Fenomeno Mixtape

EPs 
 2012: Senza mani
 2016: From the Rooftop

Singles 

Others
 2011: "E invece no"
 2012: "Ali sporche"
 2012: "Forever Alone"
 2013: "Hangover"
 2013: "Siamo morti insieme"
 2014: "Instagrammo" (with Gemitaiz & MadMan)
 2015: "La rabbia dei secondi"
 2016: "Jet"
 2016: "Niente di che"
 2016: "Lontana da me"

References 

Italian male singers
Italian rappers
1983 births
Living people
People from Nocera Inferiore